Samuel Ipoua Hamben (born 1 March 1973) is a Cameroonian former professional footballer who played as a striker.

He played for several European clubs, including OGC Nice (France), Torino (Italy), Rapid Wien (Austria), Toulouse (France), 1. FSV Mainz 05, TSV 1860 Munich and LR Ahlen in Germany. At the local level, he played for Union de Douala (Cameroon).

He played for the Cameroon national football team and was a participant at the 1998 FIFA World Cup.

His brother Guy Ipoua is also a footballer and has spent most of his career playing in England.

In July 2005, he had a failed trial with Grimsby Town.

References

External links

1973 births
Living people
Cameroonian footballers
Cameroon international footballers
Torino F.C. players
OGC Nice players
Toulouse FC players
SK Rapid Wien players
1. FSV Mainz 05 players
TSV 1860 Munich players
Rot Weiss Ahlen players
Serie B players
Ligue 1 players
Bundesliga players
2. Bundesliga players
Austrian Football Bundesliga players
Cameroonian expatriate footballers
Expatriate footballers in Italy
Expatriate footballers in France
Expatriate footballers in Austria
Expatriate footballers in Germany
Cameroonian expatriate sportspeople in Italy
Cameroonian expatriate sportspeople in France
Cameroonian expatriate sportspeople in Austria
Cameroonian expatriate sportspeople in Germany
1998 FIFA World Cup players
1998 African Cup of Nations players
Association football forwards